Acanthoptychoceras is an extinct genus of ammonites belonging to the family Ancyloceratidae.

Species
 Acanthoptychoceras spinatocostatum Manolov, 1962

Fossil record
Fossils of Acanthoptychoceras have been found in the Cretaceous of France, Italy, Bulgaria and Colombia (age range: from 130.0 to 125.45  million years ago.).

References

Ancyloceratoidea
Ammonitida genera
Paja Formation